In mathematics and theoretical physics, a quasi-sphere is a generalization of the hypersphere and the hyperplane to the context of a pseudo-Euclidean space.  It may be described as the set of points for which the quadratic form for the space applied to the displacement vector from a centre point is a constant value, with the inclusion of hyperplanes as a limiting case.

Notation and terminology 
This article uses the following notation and terminology:
 A pseudo-Euclidean vector space, denoted , is a real vector space with a nondegenerate quadratic form with signature .  The quadratic form is permitted to be definite (where  or ), making this a generalization of a Euclidean vector space.
 A pseudo-Euclidean space, denoted , is a real affine space in which displacement vectors are the elements of the space .  It is distinguished from the vector space.  
This is associated with the quadratic form .
 Two vectors  are orthogonal if .
 A normal vector at a point of a quasi-sphere is a nonzero vector that is orthogonal to each vector in the tangent space at that point.

Definition 
A quasi-sphere is a submanifold of a pseudo-Euclidean space  consisting of the points  for which the displacement vector  from a reference point  satisfies the equation
,

Since  in permitted, this definition includes hyperplanes; it is thus a generalization of generalized circles and their analogues in any number of dimensions.  This inclusion provides a more regular structure under conformal transformations than if they are omitted.

This definition has been generalized to affine spaces over complex numbers and quaternions by replacing the quadratic form with a Hermitian form.

A quasi-sphere  in a quadratic space  has a counter-sphere . One example is the unit hyperbola that forms a quasi-sphere of the hyperbolic plane, and its conjugate hyperbola, which is its counter-sphere.

Geometric characterizations

Centre and radial scalar square 
The centre of a quasi-sphere is a point that has equal scalar square from every point of the quasi-sphere, the point at which the pencil of lines normal to the tangent hyperplanes meet.  If the quasi-sphere is a hyperplane, the centre is the point at infinity defined by this pencil.

When , the displacement vector  of the centre from the reference point and the radial scalar square  may be found as follows.  We put , and comparing to the defining equation above for a quasi-sphere, we get

 
 

The case of  may be interpreted as the centre  being a well-defined point at infinity with either infinite or zero radial scalar square (the latter for the case of a null hyperplane).  Knowing  (and ) in this case does not determine the hyperplane's position, though, only its orientation in space.

The radial scalar square may take on a positive, zero or negative value.  When the quadratic form is definite, even though  and  may be determined from the above expressions, the set of vectors  satisfying the defining equation may be empty, as is the case in a Euclidean space for a negative radial scalar square.

Diameter and radius 
Any pair of points, which need not be distinct, (including the option of up to one of these being a point at infinity) defines a diameter of a quasi-sphere.  The quasi-sphere is the set of points for which the two displacement vectors from these two points are orthogonal.

Any point may be selected as a centre (including a point at infinity), and any other point on the quasi-sphere (other than a point at infinity) define a radius of a quasi-sphere, and thus specifies the quasi-sphere.

Partitioning 
Referring to the quadratic form applied to the displacement vector of a point on the quasi-sphere from the centre (i.e. ) as the radial scalar square, in any pseudo-Euclidean space the quasi-spheres may be separated into three disjoint sets: those with positive radial scalar square, those with negative radial scalar square, those with zero radial scalar square.

In a space with a positive-definite quadratic form (i.e. a Euclidean space), a quasi-sphere with negative radial scalar square is the empty set, one with zero radial scalar square consists of a single point, one with positive radial scalar square is a standard -sphere, and one with zero curvature is a hyperplane that is partitioned with the -spheres.

See also
 Anti-de Sitter space
 de Sitter space
 
 Lie sphere geometry
 Quadratic set

Notes

References 

Multi-dimensional geometry
Spheres